Dann Battistone (born 10 April 1976) is an American tennis player.

Battistone has a career high ATP doubles ranking of 177 achieved on 6 April 2009. Battistone has won 2 ATP Challenger doubles titles.

Battistone made his ATP main draw debut at the 2008 Hall of Fame Tennis Championships in the doubles draw partnering his brother Brian Battistone.

Battistone and his brother made headlines when they played using a two-handled racket.

Tour titles

Doubles

References

External links
 
 

1976 births
Living people
American male tennis players
Sportspeople from Las Vegas
Sportspeople from Santa Barbara, California
Tennis people from California